Mucilaginibacter dorajii is a Gram-negative, rod-shaped and non-motile bacterium from the genus of Mucilaginibacter which has been isolated from the rhizosphere of the plant Platycodon grandiflorus.

References

External links
Type strain of Mucilaginibacter dorajii at BacDive -  the Bacterial Diversity Metadatabase

Sphingobacteriia
Bacteria described in 2011